Callophrys mossii, commonly known as Moss's elfin, stonecrop elfin or Schryver's elfin, is a species of butterfly native to North America in the family Lycaenidae. It is found from British Columbia south to southern California and east to Wyoming and Colorado in isolated populations. The habitat consists of rocky outcrops, woody canyons and cliffs.

The wingspan is 22–28 mm. The upperside of the males is grayish brown with a tan patch on the hindwing inner margin. Females are light brown to tan with dark borders. The underside is coppery brown to purplish brown. The inner half of the hindwings is darker than the outer half. Adults are on wing from March to June in one generation per year.

The larvae feed on Sedum (including S. spathulifolium and S. lanceolatum), Sedella, Dudleya and Parvisedum species. Young larvae feed on the leaves of their host plant. When older, they feed on the flowers and fruits.

Subspecies
Listed alphabetically:
C. m. bayensis (Brown, 1939) – San Bruno elfin (California)
C. m. doudoroffi dos Passos, 1940 (California)
C. m. hidakupa Emmel, Emmel & Mattoon, 1998 (California)
C. m. marinensis Emmel, Emmel & Mattoon, 1998 (California)
C. m. mossii (Vancouver Island)
C. m. schryveri (Cross, 1937) (Colorado)
C. m. windi (Clench, 1943) (California)

References

Callophrys
Butterflies described in 1881
Butterflies of North America